Per amor vostro is a 2015 Italian drama film directed by Giuseppe M. Gaudino. It was screened in the main competition section of the 72nd Venice International Film Festival. For her performance Valeria Golino won the Volpi Cup for Best Actress.

Cast
 Valeria Golino as Anna
 Massimiliano Gallo as Gigi Scaglione
 Adriano Giannini as Michele Migliacco
 Elisabetta Mirra as Santina Scaglione
 Edoardo Crò as Arturo Scaglione
 Daria D'Isanto as Cinzia Scaglione
 Salvatore Cantalupo as Ciro
 Rosaria Di Ciocco as Dirigente studio TV

References

External links
 

2015 films
2015 drama films
Italian drama films
2010s Italian-language films
2010s Italian films